The following is a list of Lyon Metro stations. , there are 40 stations (44 stations, counting interchange stations twice) in the Lyon Metro system proper. This list includes the metro stations, as well as the stations of the two funiculars of Lyon.

Metro 

All metro stations are wheelchair accessible, and are equipped with turnstiles or automated gates.

Line A 

It, together with Line B, were the inaugural lines of the Lyon Metro, opening in 1978. An extension of Line A from Laurent Bonnevay, Astroballe to Vaul-en-Velin, La Soie opened in 2007.

 Perrache (transfer: Tram T1, Tram T2, SNCF station)
 Ampère – Victor Hugo
Bellecour (transfer: Metro D)
 Cordeliers
Hôtel de Ville – Louis Pradel (transfer: Metro C)
 Foch
 Masséna
 Charpennes – Charles Hernu (transfer: Metro B, Tram T1, Tram T4)
 République – Villeurbanne
 Gratte-Ciel
 Flachet – Alain Gilles
 Cusset
 Laurent Bonnevay – Astroballe
 Vaulx-en-Velin – La Soie, (transfer: Tram T3, Rhônexpress)

Line B 

It, together with Line A, were the inaugural lines of the Lyon Metro, opening in 1978. It has since been extended southwards twice: from Part-Dieu to Jean Macé in 1981, and again from Jean Macé to Stade de Gerland in 2000; a further extension to the train station at Oullins Gare opened in December 2013.

 Charpennes – Charles Hernu (transfer: Metro A, Tram T1, Tram T4)
 Brotteaux
 Gare Part-Dieu – Vivier Merle (transfer: Tram T1, Tram T3, Tram T4, Rhônexpress, SNCF main station)
 Place Guichard – Bourse du Travail
 Saxe-Gambetta (transfer: Metro D)
 Jean Macé (transfer: Tram T2, SNCF station)
 Place Jean Jaurès
 Debourg (transfer: Tram T1)
 Stade de Gerland
 Gare d'Oullins (transfer: SNCF station)

Line C 

It began to operate in 1974, independently of the Lyon Metro,  as a rack railway, after the conversion from a former funicular. When it was integrated into the Lyon Metro with the latter's inauguration in 1978, Line C was extended from Croix-Paquet to Hôtel de Ville; in 1984 the line reached its current northern terminus at Cuire.

Hôtel de Ville – Louis Pradel (transfer: Metro A)
 Croix-Paquet
 Croix-Rousse
 Hénon
 Cuire

Line D 

It is the newest line of the Lyon Metro, first opening in 1991. Line D has been extended twice since its opening: in 1992 from Grange Blanche to Gare de Vénissieux, and in 1997 from Gorge de Loup to Gare de Vaise.

 Gare de Vaise (transfer: SNCF station)
 Valmy
 Gorge de Loup (transfer: SNCF station)
 Vieux Lyon – Cathédrale Saint-Jean (transfer: Funicular Saint-Just, Funicular Fourvière)
Bellecour (transfer: Metro A)
 Guillotière – Gabriel Péri (transfer: Tram T1)
 Saxe-Gambetta (transfer: Metro B)
 Garibaldi
 Sans Souci
 Monplaisir-Lumière
 Grange Blanche (transfer: Tram T2, Tram T5)
 Laënnec
 Mermoz-Pinel
 Parilly
 Gare de Vénissieux (transfer: Tram T4, SNCF station)

Funiculars

Funicular Saint-Just

Vieux Lyon – Cathédrale Saint-Jean (transfer: Metro D, Funicular Fourvière)
Minimes – Théâtres romains 
Saint-Just

Funicular Fourvière 
Vieux Lyon – Cathédrale Saint-Jean (transfer: Metro D, Funicular Saint-Just)
Fourvière

See also
Vélo'v
Eurolines
Lyon Metro
Lyon tramway
Funiculars of Lyon

References

External links
Picture library of transport in Lyon

Lyon
Lyon
Metro